Mehan is an unincorporated community and census-designated place (CDP) in Payne County, Oklahoma, United States. It was first listed as a CDP prior to the 2020 census.

The CDP is in central Payne County, on the northeast side of the valley of Stillwater Creek, a southeast-flowing tributary of the Cimarron River.

Demographics

References 

Census-designated places in Payne County, Oklahoma
Census-designated places in Oklahoma